Hypatopa juno is a moth in the family Blastobasidae. It is found in Costa Rica.

The length of the forewings is 4.4–6 mm. The forewings are reddish brown or pale brownish grey intermixed with brownish-grey scales tipped with pale brownish grey and brown scales. The hindwings are translucent pale grey, gradually darkening towards the apex.

Etymology
The specific name refers to the goddess Juno.

References

Moths described in 2013
Hypatopa